Jonathan Simon Speelman (born 2 October 1956) is an English Grandmaster chess player, mathematician and chess writer.

Early life and education
He was educated at Worcester College, Oxford, where he read Mathematics.

Career
A winner of the British Chess Championship in 1978, 1985 and 1986, Speelman has been a regular member of the English team for the Chess Olympiad, an international biennial chess tournament organised by FIDE, the World Chess Federation.

He qualified for two Candidates Tournaments:

In the 1989–1990 cycle, Speelman qualified by placing third in the 1987 interzonal tournament held in Subotica, Yugoslavia. After beating Yasser Seirawan in his first round 4–1, and Nigel Short in the second round 3½–1½, he lost to Jan Timman at the semi-final stage 4½–3½.
In the following 1990–93 championship cycle, he lost 5½–4½ in the first round to Short, the eventual challenger for Garry Kasparov's crown.

Speelman's highest ranking in the FIDE Elo rating list was fourth in the world, in January 1989.

In 1989, he beat Kasparov in a televised speed tournament, and then went on to win the event.

In the April 2007 FIDE list, Speelman had an Elo rating of 2518, making him England's twelfth-highest-rated active player.

Writing
He has written a number of books on chess, including several on the endgame, among them Analysing the Endgame (1981), Endgame Preparation (1981) and Batsford Chess Endings (co-author, 1993).

Among his other books are Best Games 1970–1980 (1982), an analysis of nearly fifty of the best games by top players from that decade, and Jon Speelman's Best Games (1997). Today he is primarily a chess journalist and commentator, being the chess correspondent for The Observer and The Independent and sometimes providing commentary for games on the Internet Chess Club.

Bibliography
(partial)
Speelman, Jonathan (1981).  Analysing the Endgame.  Batsford (London, England). 142 pages. .
Speelman, Jonathan (1981).  Endgame Preparation.  B.T. Batsford (London, England). 177 pages. .
Speelman, Jon (1982).  Best Chess Games, 1970-80.  Allen & Unwin (London, England; Boston, Massachusetts).  328 pages. .
Speelman, Jonathan; Tisdall, Jon; Wade, Bob.  (1993).  Batsford Chess Endings.  B.T. Batsford (London, England). 448 pages. .
Speelman, Jon (1997).  Jon Speelman's Best Games.  B.T. Batsford (London, England). 240 pages.  .

See also

 List of Jewish chess players

References

External links
  (World Chess Federation)
 

1956 births
Living people
English chess players
Jewish chess players
Chess grandmasters
Chess Olympiad competitors
Alumni of Worcester College, Oxford
British chess writers
English male non-fiction writers
English non-fiction writers
Mathematicians from London
Place of birth missing (living people)